Alin Valer Rus (born 30 September 1975) is a Romanian former professional footballer who played as a defender in Romania for teams like: Sticla Arieşul Turda, Gloria Bistriţa, Mechel Câmpia Turzii, Pandurii Târgu Jiu or FC Hunedoara. In 2011 Rus emigrated to England where he started working as a taxi driver, in parallel he played for one and a half year for the lower leagues team, Gillingham Town.

References

External links
 
 

1975 births
Living people
People from Turda
Romanian footballers
Association football defenders
Liga I players
Liga II players
ACS Sticla Arieșul Turda players
ACF Gloria Bistrița players
CSM Câmpia Turzii players
CS Pandurii Târgu Jiu players
CS Corvinul Hunedoara players
Romanian expatriate footballers
Romanian expatriate sportspeople in England
Expatriate footballers in England
Romanian taxi drivers